Gilles Willem Benjamin Borrie (26 September 1925 – 28 December 2016) was a Dutch politician and historian. He was a member of the Labour Party. He served as the mayor of Sleen (1960–1968), Tiel (1968–1973), Rheden (1973–1979) and Eindhoven (1979–1987). He was born in Bergen op Zoom, North Brabant.

Borrie died on 28 December 2016 in Eindhoven at the age of 91.

References

1925 births
2016 deaths
Mayors of Eindhoven
Labour Party (Netherlands) politicians
People from Bergen op Zoom